The fixture between football clubs GAIS and IFK Göteborg is a local derby in Gothenburg, Sweden and a fierce rivalry. The derby is sometimes called Göteborgsklassikern or Arbetarderbyt. It is also commonly known by the collective term Göteborgsderby which is also used for other fixtures between Gothenburg clubs. GAIS started playing football in 1897 and IFK Göteborg was founded in 1904, meeting each other for the very first time in 1905. GAIS had its glory period from the late 1910s to the early 1930s, while IFK have been the dominant team for the rest of the derby's existence, winning 18 Swedish championships as well as two UEFA Cup titles. The record attendance for second tier football in Sweden, and all club football outside Allsvenskan, was set at a derby in 1976.

Rivalry culture
The rivalry between GAIS and IFK Göteborg is the biggest in Gothenburg. The latest incident between the two teams occurred in February 2019. Around 13 seconds into the second half, supporters of IFK Göteborg made a pyroshow containing fireworks who injured the GAIS goalkeeper, Marko Johansson.

Honours

Matches

Sources:

League

GAIS at home

IFK Göteborg at home

Cup

Other competitions

Records

Sources:

Biggest wins

Highest scoring matches

Longest win streak

Longest unbeaten streak

Highest attendances

Shared player and manager history

Played for both

Played for one, managed one

Played for both, managed one

Played for one, managed both

Played for both, managed both

Managed both

Notes

Citations

References

External links
Sveriges Fotbollshistoriker och Statistiker – Statistics for all Allsvenskan and Svenska Cupen matches
GAIS official website
IFK Göteborg official website

GAIS
IFK Göteborg
Football derbies in Sweden